Harbor House, also known as the George C. Case Estate, is a national historic district located at Nissequogue in Suffolk County, New York.  The district encompasses an estate with two contributing buildings, one contributing site, and two contributing structures.  The estate house is a two story with full attic structure with a gambrel roof designed in 1910.  Also on the property are a contributing carriage barn / stable and a well house.

It was added to the National Register of Historic Places in 1993.

References

Houses on the National Register of Historic Places in New York (state)
Houses completed in 1910
Houses in Suffolk County, New York
Historic districts on the National Register of Historic Places in New York (state)
National Register of Historic Places in Suffolk County, New York